In the run up to the 2015 Finnish legislative election, various organisations carried out opinion polling to gauge voting intention in Finland. Results of such polls are displayed in this article.

The date range for these opinion polls are from the previous general election, held on 17 April 2011, to the day the next election was held, on 19 April 2015.

Graphical summary

Poll results
Poll results are listed in the table below in reverse chronological order, showing the most recent first. The highest percentage figure in each poll is displayed in bold, and the background shaded in the leading party's colour. In the instance that there is a tie, then no figure is shaded. The table uses the date the survey's fieldwork was done, as opposed to the date of publication. However, if that date is unknown, the date of publication will be given instead.

Seats
Opinion polls showing seat projections are displayed in the table below. The highest seat figures in each polling survey have their background shaded in the leading party's colour. In the instance that there is a tie, then no figure is shaded. 101 seats are required for an absolute majority in the Finnish Parliament.

Notes

2015
Finland